St. Lawrence was a federal electoral district in Quebec, Canada, that was represented in the House of Commons of Canada from 1892 to 1917.

This riding was created in 1892 from parts of Montreal West and Montreal East ridings. It consisted of St. Louis and St. Lawrence wards in the city of Montreal. It was abolished in 1914 when it was redistributed into St. Lawrence—St. George and George-Étienne Cartier ridings.

Members of Parliament

This riding elected the following Members of Parliament:

Election results

See also 

 List of Canadian federal electoral districts
 Past Canadian electoral districts

External links 
 Riding history from the Library of Parliament

Former federal electoral districts of Quebec